Samuel Big Bear (December 25, 1889 - December 21, 1959), mainly referred to as simply Big Bear in the record books, was a Native American professional football player during the early years of the National Football League. During his two-year career, Big Bear played in 6 games with the Oorang Indians. He played in 1 game for the 1922 season and in 5 games for the 1923 season. He ended his professional career after the Indians disbanded in 1923. According to NFL records, Big Bear did not attend college or play college football. However, the Pro Football Researchers Association states that he attended the Carlisle Indian School located in Carlisle, Pennsylvania.

References
What's an Oorang?
The Oorang Indians
Ongoing Research Project Uniform Numbers of the NFL Pre-1933
Pro Football Archives, Big Bear

Notes

Native American players of American football
Oorang Indians players
1889 births
1959 deaths
Carlisle Indians football players
Players of American football from Nebraska
People from Thurston County, Nebraska